Senator Strode may refer to:

Aubrey E. Strode (1873–1946), Virginia State Senate
James M. Strode (1804–c. 1860), Illinois State Senate